is a Quasi-National Park in Mie and Shiga Prefectures, Japan. It was established in 1968.

Sites of interest
 Mount Gozaisho, Suzuka Mountains

Related municipalities
 Mie: Iga, Inabe, Kameyama, Komono, Suzuka, Yokkaichi
 Shiga: Higashiōmi, Hino, Kōka, Taga

See also

 List of national parks of Japan
 Ise-no-Umi Prefectural Natural Park

References

External links
  Map of parks in Shiga Prefecture (park marked in orange)

National parks of Japan
Parks and gardens in Mie Prefecture
Parks and gardens in Shiga Prefecture
Protected areas established in 1968
1968 establishments in Japan